Loudoun County Transit is a public-transportation service provided by the Loudoun County, Virginia government. The buses operate from Dulles, Leesburg, and Purcellville to Washington Metro stations as well as directly to Rosslyn, Virginia, The Pentagon, and Washington, D.C. The service is attractive because the buses, unlike normal traffic, are permitted to travel on the express lanes of the Dulles Toll Road. This allows for a shorter trip and also bypasses commuter tolls. The Loudoun County Commuter Bus accepts payment via SmarTrip, a reloadable transit card issued by the Washington Metropolitan Area Transit Authority.

Loudoun County Transit buses also operates local bus service through Sterling, Ashburn, & Leesburg. The Silver Line is being extended to Dulles Airport and Ashburn (part of Phase Two), service is available from Park and Ride locations to the Wiehle-Reston East Metro station as well as the West Falls Church Station as part of Metro Connection service. Virginia Regional Transit only operates the Purcellville Connector that is part of local bus service. LC Transit uses long buses (seating around 50) with white and metal trim and display the LC Transit logo (shown above),
while VRT buses are short (seating around 15) and have a predominantly white and maroon color scheme, frequently without a logo. Meanwhile, the local buses have buses that are around the same size as VRT buses & have the LC logo.

References

External links 

Bus transportation in Virginia
Transportation in Loudoun County, Virginia
Government in Loudoun County, Virginia